Karen S. Shapiro is an American film, television, theater and record producer. She also serves as Vice President of Partners for Progressive Israel, and serves on the Advisory Board for the Feminist Institute.

The documentary, Eva Hesse, premiered on the US television series, American Masters.

Filmography

References

Living people
American film producers
American television producers
American record producers
Year of birth missing (living people)